Bandeirantes Anthem (Hino dos Bandeirantes) is the official anthem of São Paulo state, composed by Guilherme de Almeida in the 1960s.

Lyrics

References

São Paulo (state)
Brazilian anthems
Regional songs
1960s songs